Pos Indonesia is the state-owned company responsible for providing postal service in Indonesia. It was established with the current structure in 1995 and now operates 11 regional divisions.

History

Postal service in colonial Dutch East Indies was provided by the Post, Telegraph, and Telephone Service (PTT), established in 1906. On 27 September 1945, following the proclamation of Indonesia's independence, the central PTT office in Bandung was seized from occupying Japanese forces. It became a state-owned company in 1961 and then split in 1965 to form two separate companies, one providing telecommunication services and the other mail and giro. The new mail services company was reorganized in 1978. A government decree came into effect on 6 June 1995 to create the current Pos Indonesia.

Organization

Pos Indonesia operates in 11 regional divisions across the country, each covering multiple provinces. Each region operates several hundred inner city, outer city, and remote locations. There are 3,700 post offices nationwide with 3,190 post offices providing money transfer services in co-operation with Western Union.
Region I (Medan branch): Aceh, North Sumatra
Region II (Padang branch): Riau, Riau Islands, West Sumatra
Region III (Palembang branch): Bengkulu, Jambi, South Sumatra, Bangka–Belitung Islands, Lampung
Region IV (Jakarta branch): Banten, Jakarta, West Java
Region V (Bandung branch): Banten, West Java
Region VI (Semarang branch): Central Java, Yogyakarta
Region VII (Surabaya branch): East Java
Region VIII (Denpasar branch): Bali, West Nusa Tenggara, East Nusa Tenggara
Region IX (Banjarbaru branch): West Kalimantan, Central Kalimantan, East Kalimantan, South Kalimantan
Region X (Makassar branch): North Sulawesi, Gorontalo, Central Sulawesi, West Sulawesi, South Sulawesi, Southeast Sulawesi
Region XI (Jayapura branch): North Maluku, Maluku, West Papua, Papua

See also
Postal codes in Indonesia

References
Notes

Bibliography

External links

Pos Indonesia official website 
EMS Pos Indonesia official website

Indonesia
Postal system of Indonesia
Logistics companies of Indonesia
Companies based in Bandung
Companies established in 1746
Philately of Indonesia
Government-owned companies of Indonesia
Indonesian brands
Indonesian companies established in 1995